Agelena cuspidata is a species of spider in the family Agelenidae, which contains at least 1,315 species of funnel-web spiders . It was first described by  Zhang, Zhu & Song, in 2005. It is primarily found in China.

References

cuspidata
Spiders described in 2005
Spiders of China